

Europe

Poets
 Cædmon likely flourishes from approximately 657 to 680 in Northumbria
 Laidcenn mac Buith Bannaig, Irish (d. 661)

Works
 Cædmon's Hymn, Old English 
 Dream of the Rood, Old English, possible date
 Hisperica Famina, Hiberno-Latin

Byzantine Empire

Poets
 George Pisida, in Greek

Arabic world

Poets
 Abu 'Afak, from Hijaz, a Jewish poet writing in Arabic
 Layla al-Akhyaliyya, early Banu Uqayl tribe female poet 
 Al-Rabi ibn Abu al-Huqayq fl. in Arabia just before the Hejira
 Eleazar Kalir, from Kirjath-sepher, writing in Hebrew
 Al-Khansa, in Arabia, early Islamic woman poet
 Jabal ibn Jawwal, a Jewish convert to Islam, in Arabic

Births of Arab-language poets
al-Akhtal (c. 640–710)
Kumait Ibn Zaid (679–743)
Kuthayyir (ca. 660-ca. 723)

Deaths of Arab-language poets
Maymun Ibn Qays Al-a'sha (570–625)
Antarah ibn Shaddad (525–608) 
Durayd ibn al-Simmah (d. 630)
Hassan ibn Thabit (d. c. 674)
Labīd (560–661)
Qays ibn al-Mullawah (d. 688)
al-Tirimmah (died c. 723)

Works
 Recitation of the Qur'an (approx. 609–632) and compilation of the final version under Uthman (650s?)

China

Poets
 Luo Binwang (640 – 684), Chinese writer and poet, recognized as of the Four Greats of the Early Tang
 Wang Bo (649 – 676), Tang dynasty poet
 Shen Quanqi (650 – 729), Tang dynasty poet
 He Zhizhang (659 – 744), Chinese poet of the Tang dynasty and one of the Eight Immortals of the Wine Cup
 Chen Zi'ang (661 – 702), Chinese poet of the Tang dynasty
 Shangguan Wan'er (664 – 710), Chinese poet, writer, and politician
 Zhang Jiuling (673 – 740), prominent minister, noted poet and scholar of the Tang dynasty
 Emperor Xuanzong of Tang (685 – 762), emperor and poet
 Meng Haoran (689 or 691 – 740), Chinese poet especially of the landscape, history and legends of Xiangyang
 Wang Changling (698 – 765), Tang dynasty poet

Japan
 Period of introduction of Chinese literature into Japan

Poets
 Abe no Nakamaro 阿倍仲麻呂 (c. 698 – c. 770) scholar, administrator, and waka  poet in the Nara period (surname: Abe)
Empress Jitō 持統天皇 (645–703; 702 in the lunisolar calendar used in Japan until 1873), 41st imperial ruler, fourth empress and a poet
Kakinomoto no Hitomaro 柿本 人麻呂 (c. 662–710), late Asuka period poet, nobleman and government official; the most prominent poet in the Man'yōshū anthology
Princess Nukata 額田王 also known as Princess Nukada (c. 630–690),  Asuka period poet 
Ōtomo no Tabito 大伴旅人 (c. 662–731) poet best known as the father of Ōtomo no Yakamochi; both contributed to compiling the Man'yōshū anthology; member of the prestigious Ōtomo clan; served as governor-general of Dazaifu, the military procuracy in northern Kyūshū, from 728 to 730
Yamanoue no Okura 山上 憶良 (660–733), best known for his poems of children and commoners; has poems in the Man'yōshū anthology

South Asia

Poets
 Kappe Arabhatta in Kannada
 Bhartrihari (approx.), writing in Sanskrit

Timeline
 600 – Venantius Fortunatus died about this year (born c. 530), Latin poet and hymnodist from Northern Italy
 608 – Antarah ibn Shaddad died (born 525), Arabic poet and warrior
 615 – Saint Columbanus died (born 543), Hiberno-Latin poet and writer
 625 – Maymun Ibn Qays Al-a'sha died (born 570)
 630:
 Durayd ibn al-Simmah died
 Princess Nukata 額田王 also known as Princess Nukada, born about this year (died 690),  Asuka period poet
 640 – al-Akhtal born about this year (died 710)
 645 – Empress Jitō 持統天皇 born (died 703; 702 in the lunisolar calendar used in Japan until 1873), 41st imperial ruler, fourth empress and a poet
 657 – Cædmon likely flourishes starting about this year (fl. until c. 680) in Northumbria
 660:
 Kuthayyir born about this year (died c. 723)
Yamanoue no Okura 山上 憶良 born (died 733), best known for his poems of children and commoners; has poems in the Man'yōshū anthology; Japanese
 661:
 Labīd died about this year (born c. 560); Arabic poet
 Laidcenn mac Buith Bannaig, died; Irish
 662:
 Kakinomoto no Hitomaro 柿本 人麻呂 born about this year (died 710), late Asuka period poet, nobleman and government official; the most prominent poet in the Man'yōshū anthology
 Ōtomo no Tabito 大伴旅人 born about this year (died 732) poet best known as the father of Ōtomo no Yakamochi; both contributed to compiling the Man'yōshū anthology; member of the prestigious Ōtomo clan; served as governor-general of Dazaifu, the military procuracy in northern Kyūshū, from 728 to 730
 674 – Hassan ibn Thabit died about this year
 679 – Kumait Ibn Zaid born (died 743)
 680 – Cædmon, last known to be living about this year (fl. starting 657) in Northumbria
 688 – Qays ibn al-Mullawah died
 698 – Abe no Nakamaro 阿倍仲麻呂 born about this year (died c. 770) scholar, administrator, and waka  poet in the Nara period (surname: Abe)

Decades and years

References 

7th-century poems
07
Poetry